Hemnes Church is a parish church of the Church of Norway in Hemnes Municipality in Nordland county, Norway. It is located in the village of Hemnesberget. It is the church for the Hemnes parish which is part of the Indre Helgeland prosti (deanery) in the Diocese of Sør-Hålogaland. The white, wooden church was built in an octagonal-cruciform style in 1872 using plans drawn up by the architect Niels Stockfleth Darre Eckhoff. The church seats about 800 people.

History
The earliest existing historical records of the church date back to the year 1589, but the church was not new that year. The old church building was torn down and replaced in 1658 with a new log building. The church was a cruciform design with a steeple rising from the center. Nearly one hundred years later in 1742, the old church was replaced again. The 1742 church was demolished in 1872 and replaced with the present church building. The new church was built slightly to the south of where the previous church stood. There was a cemetery located on the church grounds for centuries, but it has not been used since 1886 when a new cemetery was established to the northeast of the church.

See also
List of churches in Sør-Hålogaland

References

Hemnes
Churches in Nordland
Wooden churches in Norway
Octagonal churches in Norway
Cruciform churches in Norway
19th-century Church of Norway church buildings
Churches completed in 1872
15th-century establishments in Norway